Xiong Yi (reigned 11th century BC) was the first viscount and an early ruler of the State of Chu during early Zhou Dynasty of ancient China. Son of Xiong Kuang, he was a descendant of the Yellow Emperor and Zhuanxu through his great-grandfather Yuxiong.

Biographical sketch
Xiong Yi lived at the time of King Cheng of Zhou (reigned 1042–1021 BC) who wished to honor the most loyal officials of his predecessors King Wu of Zhou and King Wen of Zhou. The king summoned a meeting with Xiong Yi and the other vassal lords at Qiyang (northeast of modern-day Qishan County, Shaanxi Province) where Xiong Yi swore allegiance to the King and became keeper of the Maojue in the order of precedence. Along with the Xianbei clan leader he was also appointed joint guardian of the ritual torch. At the same meeting, as a result of his ancestors’ loyal service to the former kings of Zhou, Xiong Yi received a grant of land around Danyang (modern day Xichuan County, Henan Province) where he built the first capital of Chu. He then began the arduous task of clearing the thorny undergrowth from the foothills of the Jingshan Mountains so that his people could build Chu and make sacrifices to the Zhou king. King Cheng also gave Xiong Yi the hereditary title of Zĭ, roughly equivalent to a viscount.

At some time during Xiong Yi’s reign, vassal state leaders Duke Ding of Qi, Count Kang of Wey, Xie, Marquis of Jin and Bo Qin, Duke of Lu met with King Kang of Zhou. The king gave each of the three vassal leaders a precious treasure without involving the Chu ruler. Later on, during the Spring and Autumn period in 530 BCE, King Ling of Chu would once more raise the issue of Chu’s exclusion.

Xiong Yi was succeeded as ruler of Chu by his son Xiong Ai.

Notes

References

 This article is partly based on a translation of 熊繹 in Chinese Wikipedia.

Monarchs of Chu (state)
11th-century BC Chinese monarchs
Year of birth unknown
Year of death unknown